Gérard Diffloth (born in Châteauroux, France, 1939) is a French linguist who is known as a leading specialist in the Austroasiatic languages. As a retired linguistics professor, he was former employed at the University of Chicago and Cornell University. He received his Ph.D. from UCLA, after a dissertation on the Irula language. He is an advocate of immersion fieldwork for linguistic research.

Diffloth is known for his widely cited 1974 and 2005 classifications of the Austroasiatic languages.

He is a Consulting Editor of the Mon–Khmer Studies Journal.

Selected bibliography
 Diffloth, Gérard. A History of the Khmer Language. [in preparation].
 Diffloth, Gérard. The Dvaravati Old Mon Language and Nyah Kur. Monic language studies, vol. 1. Bangkok, Thailand: Chulalongkorn University Print. House, 1984. 
 Diffloth, Gérard. The Wa languages. Berkeley: Dept. of Linguistics, University of California, 1980.
 Diffloth, Gérard. An Appraisal of Benedict's Views on Austroasiatic and Austro-Thai Relations. Kyoto: Center for Southeast Asian Studies, Kyoto University, 1976.
 Diffloth, Gérard, and Zide, Norman H. Austroasiatic Number Systems. 1976.
 Diffloth, Gérard. Proto-Mon–Khmer Final Spirants. Kyoto: Center for Southeast Asian Studies, Kyoto University, 1976.
 Diffloth, Gérard. The Irula Language, a Close Relative of Tamil. Doctoral thesis, University of California, Los Angeles, 1968.

References 

University of Chicago faculty
Cornell University faculty
University of California, Los Angeles alumni
Linguists of Austroasiatic languages
Dravidologists
1939 births
Living people
Historical linguists